Phillimon Selowa (born 3 August 1986) is a Ugandan cricketer. He played in the 2014 ICC World Cricket League Division Three tournament, and in more than fifty first-class and List A matches in South Africa from 2006 to 2015.

References

External links
 

1986 births
Living people
Ugandan cricketers
Place of birth missing (living people)
KwaZulu-Natal Inland cricketers
Northerns cricketers
North West cricketers
South Western Districts cricketers